Hamid Reza Mobarrez (born February 18, 1981, in Mashhad) is an Iranian Swimmer. Mobarrez competed in 2000 Summer Olympics – Men's 100 metre Freestyle and finished 65th.

He also represented Iran at the 2004 Rome Championships and 2007 Telstra Grand Prix 2, Canberra In 2007, he held Iran's national record for 100 metres Butterfly with a time of 55:84 seconds.

Mobarrez subsequently migrated to Australia, where he became the swimming coach at Kincoppal School. On 11 January 2018, Mobarrez and his family were involved in a head-on car collision at Milton, New South Wales. His wife was killed and his five-year-old son was critically injured. The driver of the other vehicle was charged with dangerous driving occasioning death, two counts of dangerous driving occasioning grievous bodily harm, negligent driving occasioning death and negligent driving occasioning grievous bodily harm.

References 

Living people
Iranian male swimmers
Olympic swimmers of Iran
Swimmers at the 2000 Summer Olympics
1981 births
Sportspeople from Mashhad
Swimmers at the 1998 Asian Games
Swimmers at the 2006 Asian Games
Asian Games competitors for Iran